Smeegol Linux is a MeeGo and openSUSE Linux-based open source mobile operating system made available from Novell and their openSUSE Goblin Team under the name Smeegol Linux.

This Linux distribution combines openSUSE with MeeGo's netbook oriented user interface to get a new Linux distribution  designed for netbooks. What makes Smeegol Linux unique when compared to the upstream MeeGo or openSUSE is that this distribution is at its core based on openSUSE but has the MeeGo User Experience as well as a few other changes such as adding the Mono-based Banshee media player, NetworkManager-powered network configuration, a newer version of Evolution Express, and a range of social networking features for Facebook, Twitter, MySpace, Flickr and Digg, plus Firefox and Chromium web browsers already pre-installed. Any end-users can also build their own customized Smeegol Linux OS using SUSE Studio.

See also
MeeGo
openSUSE
Linux distribution
Linux

References

External links 
 Smeegol Linux ISO images download
 Smeegol Linux Repo

Mobile operating systems
SUSE Linux
Linux distributions